The following railroads operate in the U.S. state of Wisconsin.

Current railroads

Common freight carriers 

 BNSF Railway (BNSF)
 Canadian National Railway (CN) through subsidiaries Duluth, Missabe and Iron Range Railway (DMIR), Duluth, Winnipeg and Pacific Railway (DWP), Sault Ste. Marie Bridge Company (SSAM), and Wisconsin Central Ltd. (WC)
 Canadian Pacific Railway (CP) through subsidiaries Dakota, Minnesota and Eastern Railroad (DME) and Soo Line Railroad (SOO)
 Escanaba and Lake Superior Railroad (ELS)
 Fox River & Lake Superior Rail System (FOXY)
 Progressive Rail, Inc. (PGR) 
 Tomahawk Railway (TR)
 Union Pacific Railroad (UP)
 Wisconsin and Southern Railroad (WSOR)
 Wisconsin Great Northern Railroad (WGNS)
 Wisconsin Northern Railroad (WN)

Passenger carriers 

 Amtrak (AMTK)
 East Troy Electric Railroad (METW)
 Kenosha Streetcar (KAT)
 Laona and Northern Railway (LNO)
 Metra (METX)
 Mid-Continent Railway Museum (MCRY)
 Osceola and St. Croix Valley Railway (MNTX)
 The Hop
 Wisconsin Great Northern Railroad (WGNS)

Industrial/private carriers 
 Cando Rail Services (CRSX)
 Cenex Harvest States
 Port of Milwaukee
 Rail & Transload, Inc.
 Badger Mining Corporation (BMC)
 US Army (USAX)
 Wisconsin Public Service Corporation (WPSX)

Proposed 
 Great Lakes Basin Railroad

Defunct railroads

Private freight carriers 

 A.A. Bigelow Lumber Company
 A.H. Stange Lumber Company
 Albert Hess Lumber Company
 Alexander-Stewart Lumber Company
 Arpin Hardwood & Lumber Company
 Ashland Lumber Company
 Atwood Lumber & Manufacturing Company
 B.F. McMillan & Brothers Logging Company
 Barker & Stewart Lumber Company
 Bird & Wells Lumber Company
 Bissell Lumber Company
 Blackwell & Webb Lumber Company
 Bonifas-Gorman Lumber Company
 Boyd-McAlpine Lumber Company
 Brooks & Ross Lumber Company
 Brown Robbins Lumber Company
 Buckstaff & Sprague Lumber Company
 Bundy Lumber Company
 Buswell Lumber & Manufacturing Company
 C.C. Collins Lumber Company
 C.J. Kinzel Lumber Company
 C.M. Christenson Company
 Charlie Fish Lumber Company
 Chequamegon Logging Company
 Chippewa Lumber & Boom Company
 Connor Land & Lumber Company
 Copper River Land Company
 Cranberry Lumber Company
 Crane Logging & Lumber Company
 Crocker Chair Company
 D.C. Davis & Sons Lumber Company
 Daly & Sampson Company
 David Tozer Lumber Company
 Dells Paper & Pulp Company
 Doud Sons & Company
 Edward Hines Hardwood & Hemlock Company
 Edward Hines Lumber Company
 Empire Lumber Company
 F.P. Hiles Lumber Company
 Fence River Logging Company
 Flambeau Lumber Company
 Flambeau Paper Company
 Flanner-Steger Lumber Company
 Forest County Lumber Company
 Forseman & Price Lumber Company
 Forster-Mueller Lumber Company
 Forster-Whitman Lumber Company
 Foster-Latimer Lumber Company
 Fountain-Campbell Lumber Company
 Garth Lumber Company
 Geo E. Wood Lumber Company
 George W. Pratt Lumber Company
 Gilkey & Anson Lumber Company
 Girard Lumber Company
 Glenwood Manufacturing Company
 Glidden Veneer Company
 Godfrey Von Platen Lumber Company
 Goodman Lumber Company
 Goodyear Lumber Company
 Great Western Paper Company
 Gurney Lumber Company
 H.D. Mc Cool Land & Logging Company
 H.H. Stolle Lumber Company
 H.J. Wachsmuth Lumber Company
 H.W. Wright Lumber Company
 Hackley-Phelps-Bonnell Lumber Company
 Haile & Mylrea Lumber Company
 Held Lumber Company
 Holmes and Sons Logging Railroad
 Holt Lumber Company
 Hiles Lumber Company
 Ingersoll Land & Lumber Company
 Ingram Lumber Company
 J.J. Kennedy Lumber Company
 J.R. Davis Lumber Company
 J.W. Wells Lumber Company
 Jeffries Lumber Company
 John Edwards Manufacturing Company
 John Hein Lumber Company
 John H. Kaiser Lumber Company
 John Schroeder Lumber Company
 John S. Owen Lumber Company
 Joseph Defer Lumber Company
 Joseph Dessert Lumber Company
 Jump River Lumber Company
 Keith & Hiles Lumber Company
 Kimball & Clark Lumber Company
 Kneeland-McLurg Lumber Company
 Kneeland-West Lumber Company
 Lake Superior Lumber Company
 Land Log & Lumber Company
 Langlade Lumber Company
 Langley & Alderson
 Luger Lumber Company
 Mason-Donaldson Lumber Company
 McMillan-Salsich Lumber Company
 Medford Lumber Company
 Mellen Lumber Company
 Menasha Paper Company
 Menasha Woodenware Company
 Menominee Bay Shore Lumber Company
 Menominee Indian Mills
 Merrill Lumber Company
 Miner Brothers Lumber Company
 Mohr Lumber Company
 Morse & Tradewell Lumber Company
 Mosinee Paper Company
 Nash Lumber Company
 New Dells Lumber Company
 Northwestern Lumber Company
 North Wisconsin Lumber & Manufacturing Company
 Oconto Company
 O'Day & Daley Lumber Company
 Page & Landeck Lumber Company
 Paine Lumber Company
 Park Falls Lumber Company
 Peshtigo Lumber Company
 Pineville Lumber Company
 Puffer-Hubbard Lumber Company
 Quinnesec Logging Company
 R. Connor Lumber Company
 Raymond Lumber Company
 Rib Lake Lumber Company
 Rice Lake Lumber Company
 Robbins Lumber Company
 Roddis Lumber & Veneer Company
 Rust-Owen Lumber Company
 S.G. Cook
 S.J. Murphy Lumber Company
 Salsich & Wilson Lumber Company
 Sawyer-Goodman Lumber Company
 Scott & Howe Lumber Company
 Sever Anderson Logging Company
 Shanagolden Lumber Company
 Shawano Timber & Land Company
 Shores Lumber Company
 Simpson Gould & Company
 Spider Lake Lumber Company
 Sparrow-Kroll Lumber Company
 St Croix Timber & Land Company
 Stitt & Cartier
 Stuart & Sprague Lumber Company
 Thunder Lake Lumber Company
 Tipler-Grossman Lumber Company
 Tomahawk Land Company
 Turtle Lake Lumber Company
 Underwood Veneer Company
 Union Tanning Company
 Upham Manufacturing Company
 Vilas County Lumber Company
 Von Platen-Fox Lumber Company
 W.A. Osburn Lumber Company
 W.F. Switzer Lumber Company
 W.H. Gilbert Company
 Wall-Spaulding Lumber Company
 Westboro Lumber Company
 West Lumber Company
 William Bonifas Lumber Company
 William Holmes & Sons
 William Rogers Lumber Company
 Williams Salsich & Company
 Wisconsin-Michigan Lumber Company
 Wisconsin Timber & Land Company
 Yawkey & Lee Lumber Company
 Yawkey-Bissell Lumber Company

Electric 

 Appleton Electric Light and Power Company
 Ashland Light, Power and Street Railway Company
 Ashland Lighting and Street Railway Company
 Bay Shore Street Railway
 Belle City Electric Railway
 Belle City Street Railway
 Beloit Traction Company
 Chicago, Harvard and Geneva Lake Railway
 Chicago and Milwaukee Electric Railroad
 Chicago North Shore and Milwaukee Railroad
 Chippewa Valley Railway, Light and Power Company
 Chippewa Valley Electric Railroad
 Citizens' Traction Company of Oshkosh
 Eastern Wisconsin Railway and Light Company
 Eau Claire Street Railway, Light and Power Company
 Fond du Lac and Oshkosh Electric Railway
 Fond du Lac Street Railway and Light Company
 Fox River Electric Railway
 Fox River Electric Railway and Power Company
 Fox River Valley Electric Railway
 Grand Rapids Street Railroad
 Green Bay Traction Company
 Janesville Street Railway
 Kenosha Electric Railway
 La Crosse City Railway
 La Crosse and Onalaska Street Railway
 Madison City Railway
 Madison Electric Railway
 Madison and Interurban Traction Company
 Madison Traction Company
 Manitowoc and Northern Traction Company
 Marinette Gas, Electric Light and Street Railway Company
 Menasha and Neenah Street Railway
 Merrill Railway and Lighting Company
 Milwaukee City Railroad
 Milwaukee Light, Heat and Traction Company
 Milwaukee Northern Railway
 Milwaukee, Racine and Kenosha Electric Railway
 Milwaukee Street Railway
 Milwaukee and Wauwatosa Electric Company
 Milwaukee and Wauwatosa Motor Railway
 Milwaukee and Wauwatosa Rapid Transit Company
 Milwaukee Western Electric Railway
 Neenah and Menasha Railway
 North Greenfield and Waukesha Electric Railway
 Oshkosh Street Railroad
 Sheboygan Railway and Electric Company
 Sheboygan City Railway
 Sheboygan Light, Power and Railway Company
 Southern Wisconsin Railway
 Superior Rapid Transit Railway
 The Milwaukee Electric Railway and Light Company
 Waukesha Beach Electric Railway
 Waukesha Electric Railway
 Waupaca Electric Light and Railway Company
 Wausau Street Railroad
 West Side Railroad
 Winnebago Traction Company
 Wisconsin Railway, Light and Power Company
 Wisconsin Electric Railway
 Wisconsin Gas and Electric Company
 Wisconsin Public Service Company
 Wisconsin Rapid Transit Company
 Wisconsin Traction, Light, Heat and Power Company

Not completed 

 Bayfield and St. Croix Railway

See also 

 2020 Wisconsin railroad map

Notes

References 

 Association of American Railroads (2002),  . Retrieved January 25, 2005.
 
 
 
 
  from the Wisconsin Department of Transportation

Wisconsin
Railroads